Mulambin is a coastal town and locality in the Livingstone Shire, Queensland, Australia. In the  the locality of Mulambin had a population of 921 people.

Geography 
The eastern boundary of Mulambin is the beach fronting onto the Coral Sea. The Scenic Highway runs from the north to the south as an esplanade between the beach and the residential area. The western boundary is Mulambin Creek which flows from the north to the south into Causeway Lake. The western part of the locality is largely undeveloped freehold land.

History
In the  the locality of Mulambin had a population of 921 people.

References

External links 

 

Towns in Queensland
Shire of Livingstone
Capricorn Coast
Localities in Queensland